Pycnotarsa is a genus of moths of the family Oecophoridae.

Species
Pycnotarsa hydrochroa Meyrick, 1920
Pycnotarsa sulphurea (Busck, 1914)

References

Markku Savela's ftp.funet.fi

 
Oecophorinae
Moth genera
Taxa named by Edward Meyrick